Kuyper College is a ministry-focused Christian leadership college in Grand Rapids, Michigan that educates and trains Christian leaders for ministry and service. Through the integration of an academic curriculum and a Reformed worldview, they provide students who desire a biblical and academic college experience with the opportunity to live life through the filter of scripture.

History

Kuyper College was founded in 1939 as Reformed Bible Institute. RBI had a three-year curriculum that offered a track into foreign and domestic missions. In 1970, after a five-year redesign of the curriculum and programs, the Michigan Department of Education gave the school the right to confer a four-year Bachelor degree. As a result, RBI changed its name to Reformed Bible College. On April 21, 2006, RBC once again changed its name, this time to Kuyper College after Abraham Kuyper (1837 - 1920). Kuyper was Prime Minister of The Netherlands from 1901 - 1905 and a theologian. He also played an important role in founding de Vrije Universiteit. Pre-seminary, youth ministry, and cross-cultural missions programs are part of the Bible curriculum, and social work, education, accounting, communication, business and other majors.

Academics
Kuyper is focused on Christian service regardless of vocation, so it not only offers ministry programs, but a range of degree programs in social work, business, communication, education, and many others all within a Reformed perspective.  The student-to-faculty ratio is 11 to 1.

In the 2013-2014 school year, 261 students total were enrolled at Kuyper. In 2015, there are 245 students total.

Accreditation
Kuyper is approved and regulated by the Board of Education of the State of Michigan. It is also accredited by the Association for Biblical Higher Education (ABHE), and the Higher Learning Commission (HLC). In addition, the college social work program is accredited with the Council on Social Work Education (CSWE).

The college is a member of the National Association of Christian College Admissions Personnel (NACCAP), and has endorsed that body's “Principles of Good Practice.” Kuyper holds affiliate membership within the Council for Christian Colleges and Universities.

Sources

Grand Rapids Press, Friday, April 21, 2006

External links
Official website

Universities and colleges in Kent County, Michigan
Liberal arts colleges in Michigan
Universities and colleges affiliated with the Christian Reformed Church
Educational institutions established in 1939
Education in Grand Rapids, Michigan
1939 establishments in Michigan
Private universities and colleges in Michigan